John Blennerhassett or Hasset (by 1521 – 1573), of Barsham by Beccles, Suffolk, was an English landowner and member of parliament. His cousins became substantial landowners in Ireland.

He was a son of Sir Thomas Blennerhassett and Margaret Braham. Originally from Cumbria, the Blennerhassetts had become substantial landowners in Suffolk and Norfolk, where John Blennerhassett held estates at Depwade and Long Stratton. The family had a long tradition of service to the Duke of Norfolk, which John continued. He was one of the two members of parliament for Horsham in 1558 and for Norwich in 1563 and again in 1571. He seems never to have spoken in the House. He was also a member of Norwich Corporation, to which he presented two silver cups in 1562.

Continuing a long family tradition he was in the service of Thomas Howard, 4th Duke of Norfolk, acting as his legal advisor and treasurer of the household. He was not implicated in Norfolk's treasonable activities, which led to his downfall and execution in 1572, but died only a year later.

He married firstly Elizabeth Cornwallis and secondly Mary Echyngham (younger daughter of Sir Edward Echyngham and his second wife Ann Everard), and by two marriages had six sons and five daughters.

His cousin  Sir Edward Blennerhassett of Horsford was the father of another Sir John Blennerhassett, a barrister who became Chief Baron of the Irish Exchequer, and also of Thomas and Edward, who played a part in the Plantation of Ulster. Another cousin, Robert Blennerhassett, founded the long-established Blennerhassett family of Ballyseedy, County Kerry.

References

1573 deaths
People from Waveney District
English MPs 1563–1567
English MPs 1571
English MPs 1558
John
Year of birth uncertain